Eupales is a genus of leaf beetles in the subfamily Eumolpinae. The genus contains only one species, Eupales ulema, which is found in Southeast Europe, mostly in Hungary, the Balkan Peninsula, and Turkey. Eupales is recognised as a primitive member of Eumolpinae, and it shares some features with the Spilopyrinae.

Taxonomy
The genus was originally known as Pales, named in 1836 by the French entomologist Louis Alexandre Auguste Chevrolat in Dejean's Catalogue des Coléoptères, but this name was preoccupied by the fly genus Pales Robineau-Desvoidy, 1830. The replacement name Eupales was created by Édouard Lefèvre in 1885. Floricola is an older available name for the genus, created by Gistel in 1848; however, almost all authors have used Eupales in the last 125 years.

In Verma et al. (2005), the genus is placed as the only member of the tribe Eupalini. However, the name "Eupalini" was not explicitly indicated as new, so it is currently considered an unavailable name according to the International Code of Zoological Nomenclature. In the sixth volume of the Catalogue of Palaearctic Coleoptera and in Bouchard et al. (2011), the genus is placed as incertae sedis within Eumolpinae instead.

An application to the International Commission on Zoological Nomenclature was sent in 2009 to conserve both the names Eupales and Eupalini, but the case was never published.

Description
Eupales ulema has an oblong body with a golden metallic green color and a light golden pubescence. It has simple tarsal claws.

Food plants
Eupales has been reported from two species of dogwoods, Cornus mas and Cornus sanguinea, as well as other plants such as Pyrus spp. In Hungary, it appears to be restricted to Cornus mas.

References

Eumolpinae
Beetles of Europe
Monotypic Chrysomelidae genera
Taxa named by Édouard Lefèvre